The Bombay Presidency Radio Club (also known as Radio Club) is a sports club located in Colaba, Mumbai. Founded by Giachand Motwane,the first programmed radio broadcast in India was made from here. Until 1927, it was the only operating radio station in Bombay.

References

External links 
 Official website

Sports clubs in Mumbai
Year of establishment missing